Marine Deleeuw (born 8 August 1994) is a French model.

Career
Marine Deleeuw was discovered at a Belgian model contest called Future Top Model. She started her career in the 2012/2013 doing shows for Trussardi, Tommy Hilfiger, Thakoon Panichgul, Hervé Leger, Belstaff, Louis Vuitton, Moschino, Francesco Scognamiglio, and Missoni. She opened Rag & Bone, BCBG Max Azria, and Giambattista Valli. She closed Rag & Bone, Marc by Marc Jacobs, John Galliano, and Jill Stuart; she also walked for Chanel, Dior, Prada, Valentino and Zuhair Murad that season.

She has appeared in advertisements for Carven, Zara, Dolce & Gabbana, Louis Vuitton, Givenchy, J. Crew, Iceberg, Tory Burch, and Jil Sander among others.

References 

 

1994 births
Living people
French female models
People from Valenciennes
Elite Model Management models